Child Placing Agency Inclusion Act (House Bill 24 (HB 24)) is a 2017 anti-LGBT law that was enacted in the state of Alabama that permits taxpayer-funded adoption agencies to deny services on the basis of religious exemptions.

Passage

On April 18, 2017, the Alabama Senate passed HB 24, with 23 yeas and 9 nays. On April 18, 2017, the Alabama House of Representatives passed HB 24, with 87 yeas and 6 abstaining. On April 27, 2017, it was assigned Act No. 2017-213. On May 3, 2017, Governor Kay Ivey signed it into law. This is in the Code of Alabama under Title 26 Chapter 10D.

See also
 LGBT rights in Alabama

References

2017 in LGBT history
Alabama law
Alabama statutes
LGBT in Alabama
Politics of Alabama